Benacre Hall is a Grade II listed country house and estate in Benacre, Suffolk. The current house is high Georgian, with Palladian geometric influence and figures externally roughly as it stood on its building, in 1764. It is the seat of the Gooch baronets.

History
In the Tudor reign of Queen Elizabeth, Benacre was a lesser possession, likely fully tenanted, of Gregory Fiennes, 10th Baron Dacre. 

Henry North, of Laxfield, descended from the noble North family and purchased it in the Stuart reign of Charles I. In 1708, Edward North, dying without issue, left it to Thomas Carthew, his wife's relation, who in 1721, rebuilt the house which it is confirmed was for own use. From his son the estate was bought in 1745 by Sir Thomas Gooch, one of the successive Gooch baronets and it has ever since been the residence of that family.

Architecture
In 1827, Henry Davy wrote:

References

External links

Suffolk heritage assets: Benacre Hall including stables and medieval deer park

Country houses in Suffolk
Houses completed in 1764
Grade II listed buildings in Suffolk
1764 establishments in England